Screwballs is a 1983 Canadian teen sex comedy film that was inspired by the success of Porky's.

Plot
In 1965, five boys at Taft and Adams High School try to see the bare breasts of Purity Bush, the most beautiful girl in school. After being set up, reprimanded and sent to detention by the principal because of Purity, they plot their revenge.

Production
Jim Wynorski designed the poster and said that he was inspired by Mad magazine. Linda Shayne posed for the blonde figure on the poster.

Reception

Critical
Variety magazine called the film "a poor man's Porky's... full of youthful exuberance and proves utterly painless to watch, but it is so close in premise and tone to its model that negative comparisons can't help but be drawn". At Metacritic, the film has a score of 34 out of 100 based on seven reviews.

Box office
The film was released in U.S. theaters by New World Pictures in April 1983 and grossed $2,082,215.

Sequels
The film led to two sequels, Screwballs II (1985) and Screwball Hotel (1988).

References

External links
 
 Review of film at Canuxploitation
 Review of film at AV Club
 Review of film at Mondo Digital
 

1983 films
Canadian teen comedy films
1980s sex comedy films
1980s teen comedy films
1980s exploitation films
1980s high school films
Teen sex comedy films
Films about pranks
Films set in 1965
Canadian independent films
Canadian sex comedy films
English-language Canadian films
1980s English-language films
Films directed by Rafal Zielinski
1983 comedy films
1980s Canadian films